The 2012 Motegi GT 250km was the eighth and final points scoring round of the 2012 Super GT season. It took place on October 28, 2012.

Race results

References
 Race results 

Motegi GT 250km